Chiromachla chalcosidia is a moth of the  subfamily Arctiinae. It is found in the Democratic Republic of Congo and Uganda.

Subspecies
Chiromachla chalcosidia chalcosidia
Chiromachla chalcosidia seriatopunctata (Aurivillius, 1925) (Democratic Republic of Congo)

References

Nyctemerina
Moths described in 1910